The Hova gallinule (Hovacrex roberti) is an extinct bird in a monotypic genus in the rail family. It was a large gallinule that was endemic to Madagascar. About the size of the Tasmanian nativehen, it was originally placed in the same genus, Tribonyx. Hovacrex may also be synonymous with Gallinula. The lack of wing bones in the subfossil material found at Sirabé in central Madagascar makes it uncertain as to whether the species was flightless.

References

Rallidae
Extinct birds of Madagascar
Pleistocene birds of Africa
Fossil taxa described in 1897
Birds described in 1897